This is a summary of 1905 in music in the United Kingdom.

Events
March – Percy Grainger attends a lecture by Lucy Broadwood and becomes interested in collecting folk songs. In the summer, he goes on a tour of Denmark.
26 June – Music hall stars Frank Leo and Sable Fern are married in Southwark, and form a double act, three years after the suicide of her estranged husband Walter "Watty" Allan created a scandal.
31 August – The White Chrysanthemum, by Leedham Bantock, Arthur Anderson and Howard Talbot, premièred in Newcastle the previous year, opens at the Criterion Theatre in London's West End, where it runs for 179 performances.
21 October – The Fantasia on British Sea Songs, arranged by Sir Henry Wood to commemorate the centenary of the Battle of Trafalgar, is performed for the first time, by the Queen's Hall Orchestra at a Promenade Concert. 
date unknown – German-born George Henschel becomes organist of the German Embassy Church in London.

Popular music
"I Love a Lassie", by Harry Lauder
"Welcome Home, Sailor Boy!", by C. W. Murphy

Classical music: new works
Benjamin Dale – Piano Sonata
Frederick Delius
A Mass of Life (part 1)
Violin Sonata no 1
Edward Elgar – Introduction and Allegro for Strings
Charles Villiers Stanford – Serenade in F major
Ralph Vaughan Williams – Songs of Travel
Haydn Wood – Phantasy String Quartet

Opera
Amherst Webber – Fiorella

Musical theatre
30 May – The Spring Chicken, with music by Ivan Caryll and Lionel Monckton and lyrics by Adrian Ross, Percy Greenbank and George Grossmith, opens at the Gaety Theatre; it runs for 401 performances.

Births
2 January – Michael Tippett, composer (died 1998) 
5 February – Clifton Parker, theatre and film composer (died 1989)
11 March – Michael Carr, composer and songwriter (died 1968)
2 May – Alan Rawsthorne, composer (died 1971)
23 August – Constant Lambert, composer (died 1951)
7 November – William Alwyn, composer (died 1985)
21 November – Ted Ray, comedian and violinist (died 1977)
31 December – Jule Styne, London-born songwriter (died 1994)
date unknown – Fred Hartley, pianist, conductor and composer of light music (died 1980)

Deaths
12 February – Edward Dannreuther, Strasbourg-born pianist, founder of the English Wagner Society (b. 1844)
11 April – David Braham, musical theatre composer (born 1834)
29 June – Herbert Stephen Irons, organist and composer, 71
20 September – Walter Cecil Macfarren, pianist, composer and conductor, 79
18 October – Emmie Owen, operatic soprano and actress, 33 (hepatic cirrhosis gastric ulcer)
9 December – Henry Holmes, composer and violinist (b. 1839)

See also
 1905 in the United Kingdom

References

British Music, 1905 in
Music
British music by year
1900s in British music